Parliament House was a gay resort on the Orange Blossom Trail in Florida, United States, that included several bars and hosted performances such as drag shows. There were 112 rooms in the complex, which encompassed ten thousand square feet, including an outdoor stage, a swimming pool, and a dance floor. The resort was established in 1975, and eventually became the most well-known gay resort in Orlando. In 2006, the resort expanded to include a timeshare. In 2010, Parliament House was in danger of foreclosure. In 2012, Kenneth Creuzer, a 48-year-old HIV-positive man, was arrested on charges relating to his having allegedly raped a man at Parliament House. Alison Arngrim, who portrayed Nellie Oleson on the television series Little House on the Prairie, performed a one-person show called "Confessions of a Prairie Bitch" at Parliament House in 2013. On July 25, 2014, the resort filed for Chapter 11 bankruptcy, with $12.4 million in debts and nearly $4 million in assets. In February 2015, a fourteen-million-dollar debt relief plan was approved by the relevant parties. In 2019, NewNowNext declared Parliament House the most popular gay bar in the United States.

Parliament House Resort was the only remaining motor inn from the Parliament House Motor Inn chain. It closed on November 2, 2020, and demolition began on the complex on January 4, 2021.

Decline and closure
Parliament House saw a decline in condition, service and patronage in its final years. As of March 2019, the property was listed for sale at $16.5 million. On October 28, 2020, Parliament House's owners announced that they had been unable to secure financing to renovate the existing venue and that it would close on November 2. They further stated: "In the coming weeks, we'll reveal our plans for the immediate future.... This is by no means goodbye. We promise to keep you updated about our grand re-opening."

Notable performers
Courtney Act
Roxxxy Andrews
Alison Arngrim
Claudja Barry
Jackie Beat
Andy Bell
Willam Belli
BenDeLaCreme
Sandra Bernhard
Bob the Drag Queen
Pandora Boxx
Jocelyn Brown
Belinda Carlisle
Carmen Carrera
Cazwell
Violet Chachki
Charo
Coko
Company B
Deborah Cox
Frenchie Davis
Taylor Dayne
Bianca Del Rio
Adore Delano
Kat Deluna
Alyssa Edwards
Estelle
Laganja Estranja
Nina Flowers
Gloria Gaynor
Macy Gray
Debbie Gibson
Keri Hilson
Jennifer Holliday
Loleatta Holloway
Thelma Houston
Ivy Queen
Erika Jayne
France Joli
Leslie Jordan
Katya
Kelis
Chaka Khan
Khia
Eartha Kitt
Kristine W
Lady Bunny
Cyndi Lauper
NeNe Leakes
Paul Lekakis
Amanda Lepore
Lil' Kim
Lil' Mo
Lisa Lisa
Manila Luzon
Ts Madison
Martika
Trixie Mattel
Jonny McGovern
Varla Jean Merman
Chad Michaels
Ginger Minj
Jinkx Monsoon
Mýa
Sharon Needles
Paul Parker
Miss Coco Peru
Prince Poppycock
Randy Rainbow
LeAnn Rimes
Vicki Sue Robinson
Latrice Royale
RuPaul
Salt-N-Pepa
Tyra Sanchez
Shangela
Jordin Sparks
Byron Stingily
Rip Taylor
Alaska Thunderfuck
Tiffany
Trina
The Village People
Sherry Vine
Michelle Visage
Martha Wash
Crystal Waters
The Weather Girls
Suzanne Westenhoefer
Betty Who
Wilson Phillips
Ms. Darcel Stevens
Axel Andrews
Kylie Sonique Love
The Footlight Players

References

Bibliography

1975 establishments in Florida
2020 disestablishments in Florida
Defunct LGBT nightclubs in the United States
LGBT history in Florida
LGBT nightclubs in Florida
Drinking establishments in Florida
Defunct hotels in Florida
LGBT in Florida
LGBT tourism
Demolished buildings and structures in Florida
Buildings and structures demolished in 2021